Aleftina Pryakhina (Russian: Алевтина Пряхина) (born 13 June 1972) is a Soviet former artistic gymnast. At the 1987 European Championships, she won a silver medal in the all-around and a bronze medal on floor exercise. She is known for her daring skills which were considered very hard for the time period. These skills include the double twisting double tuck on floor (H), full twisting back tuck on balance beam (F), and the round off full twist mount on the uneven bars (D) Pryakhina was an alternate for the Soviet team at the 1987 World Championships in Rotterdam.

Competitive history

References

1972 births
Living people
Soviet female artistic gymnasts